Discrimination in the original and broadest sense is the ability to distinguish one thing from another.

Business and engineering
 Discrimination testing is a technique employed in sensory analysis to determine whether there is a detectable difference among two or more products.
 Markovian discrimination is a method used in spam filters to model the statistical behaviors of spam and nonspam.
 Net bias (also called data discrimination) is the differentiation of price or quality of Internet data transmission.
 Price discrimination, or price differentiation, is a pricing strategy where identical or similar goods or services are sold at different prices by the same provider to different customers.
 Selectivity (circuit breakers) (also known as circuit breaker discrimination) is the coordination of overcurrent protection devices so that a fault in the installation is cleared by the protection device located immediately upstream of the fault.
 Term discrimination is a way to rank keywords in how useful they are for information retrieval.
 Word sense discrimination is the automatic identification of the senses of a word.

Biology and psychology
 Discrimination learning is a topic in the psychology of learning studying the process by which animals or people learn to make different responses to different stimuli.
 Host discrimination is the ability of some parasitoids to distinguish a host with parasites from an unparasitized host.
 Kin discrimination is an organism's ability to distinguish between close genetic kin and non-kin.
 Self-discrimination in plants is the ability of plants to avoid twining tendrils around themselves.
 Tactile discrimination is the ability to differentiate information received through the sense of touch.
 The texture discrimination task is a common task used in visual perception learning.
 Two-point discrimination is the ability to discern that two nearby objects touching the skin are distinct.
 Utrocular discrimination is the ability to tell which of two eyes has been stimulated by light.

Other uses
 Carbon isotope discrimination is the property of certain molecules to preferentially bind specific isotopes of carbon.
 Discrimination information is a term in information theory and statistics.

See also

 Discriminant (disambiguation), a term in mathematics.